Finn is generally regarded as a masculine given name. The name has several origins. In some cases it is derived from the Old Norse personal name and byname Finnr, meaning "Sámi" or "Finn". In some cases the Old Norse name was a short form of other names composed with this element (Thorfinn). In other cases, the name Finn is derived from the Irish Fionn, meaning "white" or "fair".

It is also occasionally a female given name.

People with the given name
 Finn Atkins (born 1989), British actress
 Finn Bálor (born 1981), ring name of professional wrestler Fergal Devitt
 Finn Carter (born 1960), American actress 
 Finn M. W. Caspersen (1941–2009), American financier
 Finn Devold (1902–1977), Norwegian explorer and marine biologist
 Finn Graff (born 1938), Norwegian illustrator
 Finnegan "Finn" Harries, a Youtuber on the YouTube channel JacksGap
 Finn Isaksen (1924–1987), Norwegian politician
 Finn Christian Jagge (1966–2020), Norwegian alpine skier
 Finn Jones (born 1988), English actor
 Finn Juhl (30 January 1912 – 17 May 1989), Danish Architect and Industrial Designer
 Finn Laudrup (born 1945), Danish international footballer
 Finn Lambrechts (1900–1956), Lieutenant General of the Royal Norwegian Air Force
 Finn Lied (1916–2014), Norwegian politician
 Finn Nørgaard (1959–2015), Danish filmmaker
 Finn Pedersen (1925–2012), Danish Olympic rower
 Finn Ronne (1899–1980), Norwegian Antarctic explorer
 Finn Russell (born 1992), professional rugby union player who plays for Glasgow Warriors and the Scottish national team
 Finn Taylor  (born 1958), American Norwegian Screenwriter and Director. 
 Finn Tugwell (born 1976), Danish table tennis player
 Finn Wagle (born 1941), Norwegian theologian
 Finn Wentworth (born 1958), American entrepreneur and philanthropist
 Finn Wittrock (born 1984), American actor
 Finn Wolfhard (born 2002), Canadian actor and musician

Fictional Characters 
 Finn, from the Star Wars sequel trilogy
 Finn the Human, from Adventure Time
 Finn Hudson, a main character in the Fox musical comedy television series Glee
 Finn, from Arcane
 Finn McCool or MacCool (Fionn mac Cumhaill), hero in Irish mythology
 protagonist of the 1994 Finn Mac Cool (novel) by Morgan Llywelyn
Finn McMissile (Cars 2) by Pixar
Finn (Storm Hawks)

References

Irish masculine given names
Irish-language masculine given names
Scandinavian masculine given names
English-language unisex given names
English masculine given names
English feminine given names